Imitomyia is a genus of bristle flies in the family Tachinidae.

Species
Imitomyia hungarica (Thalhammer, 1897)
Imitomyia kivuensis Verbeke, 1962
Imitomyia mica Richter, 1976
Imitomyia mochii (Bezzi, 1917)
Imitomyia nitida (Emden, 1945)
Imitomyia sugens (Loew, 1863)

References

Diptera of North America
Diptera of Asia
Diptera of Africa
Diptera of Europe
Dexiinae
Tachinidae genera
Taxa named by Charles Henry Tyler Townsend